Anthology is the first compilation album by American rhythm and blues group The Miracles. It was released in 1974 by Motown Records.

Critical reception 

Music critic Robert Christgau included the album in his basic rock library of records before 1980, published in Christgau's Record Guide: The '80s (1990).

Track listing

Side One
"Got a Job" (Smokey Robinson, Berry Gordy, Tyrone Carlo) - 2:40
"Bad Girl" (Robinson, Gordy) - 2:41
"Way Over There" (Robinson, Gordy) - 2:48
"(You Can) Depend on Me" (Robinson, Gordy) - 3:08
"Shop Around" (Robinson, Gordy) - 2:47
"Who's Lovin' You" (Robinson) - 2:52
"What's So Good About Goodbye" (Robinson) - 2:20

Side Two
"I'll Try Something New" (Robinson) - 2:33
"I've Been Good To You" (Robinson) - 2:35
"You've Really Got a Hold on Me" (Robinson) - 2:49
"A Love She Can Count On" (Robinson) - 2:39
"Mickey's Monkey" (Brian Holland, Lamont Dozier, Eddie Holland) - 2:39
"I Gotta Dance to Keep From Crying" (Holland, Dozier, Holland) - 2:39
"I Like It Like That" (Robinson, Marv Tarplin) - 2:44

Side Three
"That's What Love Is Made Of" (Robinson, Bobby Rogers, Pete Moore) - 2:48
"Come On Do The Jerk" (Robinson, Rogers, Moore, Ronnie White) - 2:47
"Ooo Baby Baby" (Robinson, Moore) - 2:42
"Tracks of My Tears" (Robinson, Moore, Tarplin) - 2:53
"My Girl Has Gone" (Robinson, Moore, Tarplin, White) - 2:43
"Choosey Beggar" (Robinson, Moore) - 2:30
"Going to a Go-Go" (Robinson, Moore, Rogers, Tarplin) - 2:48

Side Four
"(Come 'Round Here) I'm the One You Need" (Holland, Dozier, Holland) - 2:33
"Save Me" (Robinson, Moore, Rogers) - 2:21
"The Love I Saw in You Was Just a Mirage" (Robinson, Tarplin) - 2:59
"More Love" (Robinson) - 2:39
"I Second That Emotion" (Robinson, Al Cleveland) - 2:39
"If You Can Want" (Robinson) - 2:42
"Yester Love" (Robinson, Cleveland) - 2:16

Side Five
"Special Occasion" (Robinson, Cleveland) - 2:17
"Baby, Baby Don't Cry" (Robinson, Cleveland, Terry Johnson) - 3:29  
"Doggone Right" (Robinson, Cleveland, Tarplin) - 2:56
"Here I Go Again" (Robinson, Johnson, Cleveland, Moore) - 2:56
"Abraham, Martin and John" (Dick Holler) - 2:59
"Darling Dear" (George Gordy, Allen Story, Rosemary Gordy) - 3:07
"Point It Out" (Robinson, Cleveland, Tarplin) - 2:54

Side Six
"Who's Gonna Take the Blame" (Nick Ashford, Valerie Simpson) - 3:34
"The Tears of a Clown" (Robinson, Hank Cosby, Stevie Wonder) - 2:59
"I Don't Blame You At All" (Robinson) - 2:57
"Satisfaction" (Robinson) - 3:20
"Crazy About the La La La" (Robinson) - 2:59
"We've Come Too Far to End It Now" (Wade Brown, David Jones, Johnny Bristol) - 3:25
"I Can't Stand to See You Cry" (Brown, Jones, Bristol) - 3:28

References

The Miracles compilation albums
1974 compilation albums
Motown compilation albums
Albums produced by Smokey Robinson
Albums produced by Pete Moore
Albums produced by Frank Wilson (musician)
Albums produced by Brian Holland
Albums produced by Berry Gordy
Albums produced by Lamont Dozier
Albums produced by Ashford & Simpson
Albums produced by Johnny Bristol
Albums arranged by Paul Riser